Sunset Coast is the name given by Tourism Western Australia to the coastal section of the northern metropolitan area of Perth, the capital city of Western Australia, and is one of the six component tourism precincts of the Perth region. While not in extensive use locally, since the 1990s it has been a centrepiece of Western Australian tourism planning and is used in interstate and overseas marketing of the region. The region contains many white sand beaches.

Boundaries

The region starts at Cottesloe and includes the Scarborough precinct, Trigg Beach, Hillarys Boat Harbour, Mindarie Keys and Perth's northernmost beach at Two Rocks, which contains a marina and was formerly home to the Atlantis Marine Park. While the official Sunset Coast promotion website regards Two Rocks as the boundary, Tourism Western Australia includes the town of Lancelin, 125 km north of Perth, in their definition.

Administrative 

The region comprises seven local government areas including:

Town of Cottesloe
Town of Claremont with Swanbourne
Town of Cambridge with City Beach and Floreat
City of Stirling with Scarborough and Trigg
City of Joondalup with Sorrento, Hillarys, Mullaloo and Burns Beach
City of Wanneroo with Mindarie, Quinns Rocks, Yanchep and Two Rocks
Shire of Gingin with Lancelin

Attractions and facilities
Marmion Marine Park, off the coast from Trigg Island to Burns Beach, is home to many marine mammals who can be seen active in their natural environment.
North of Marmion is Hillarys Boat Harbour, which includes Sorrento Quay and AQWA (formerly Underwater World).
Popular activities include windsurfing, kitesurfing, fishing and swimming.
Sculpture by the Sea, an annual public exhibition of sculptures held at Cottesloe Beach.
Wanneroo Show, one of the biggest community events in the Sunset Coast.

See also
 Coastal regions of Western Australia
 Sunset Coast Tourist Drive
 Turquoise Coast (Western Australia)

References

 
 Lamb, Gordon. (2001) Sunset Coast, Perth, Western Australia: free map & visitors' guide to attractions and facilities on the Sunset Coast. Yanchep, W.A.: G. Lamb -  City of Joondalup and City of Wanneroo.

External links
Sunset Coast official website

Tourist attractions in Perth, Western Australia
Coastline of Western Australia